The JOMA Project aims to develop Mozambican youths' capacity to recognize and adopt behaviors to reduce HIV transmission. In collaboration with government and NGO partners, the project has realized its aims through annual conferences and support of school-based communications clubs since 2006.

History
The JOMA Project was conceived by Peace Corps volunteers in Mozambique and officially began in April 2006 with a conference for teachers and students from 17 Mozambican secondary schools.  Since 2006, the project has expanded and now functions in 39 secondary schools in all of Mozambique's provinces.   Although originally focused on young men, young women are now involved in some programs and were invited to the 2009 conferences.

Philosophy
The JOMA Project was created to reduce the incidence of HIV transmission among Mozambican youth by promoting positive behaviors through an activities-based club curriculum. It is funded in part by the President's Emergency Plan for AIDS Relief.

The project has three primary focus areas:

1. Implementation of community-level communication projects by secondary school students and teachers.

2. Identification and training of Mozambican teachers to guide youth in the exploration of Mozambican cultural norms and the selection of healthy behaviors.

3. Promotion of healthy behavior among Mozambican youth through various communication project-produced media

School club activities 

The JOMA Project implements communication clubs in journalism, photography, theater, and art in secondary schools across Mozambique. Clubs are facilitated by Mozambican teachers and Peace Corps volunteers. The JOMA Project provides Mozambican teachers and Peace Corps volunteers with project supplies and a training curriculum to use during regular club meetings.

Regional training conferences 
Every year, the JOMA Project organizes week-long regional conferences to supplement school club activities. The conferences are attended by teacher and student representatives from participating clubs.

In 2009, the JOMA Project held 3 regional conferences in Mozambique's south, central, and north regions, respectively.

During training conferences, students and teachers create a presentation (newspaper, theater performance, photo display or mural) using skills learned from Mozambican professionals. While teachers learn about club facilitation, youth participate in discussions and activities that promote an ongoing debate on gender roles and conceptions of HIV.

While both young men and women participate in club activities, JOMA's conferences separate students by sex to provide youth a safe environment in which they can discuss sensitive and difficult issues. In 2009, JOMA began coordinating its conferences with REDES, an organization that holds all-female conferences for secondary school-based "girls' clubs".

When teachers and students return to their communities from the conferences, they bring new skills and ideas to teach the other members of their clubs.

See also 
 HIV/AIDS in Mozambique

References

External links
 JOMA's official website

HIV/AIDS organizations
Medical and health organisations based in Mozambique